Actinacantha is a genus of Southeast Asian orb-weaver spiders containing the single species, Actinacantha globulata. It was  first described by Eugène Simon in 1864, and has only been found in Indonesia.

References

Araneidae
Monotypic Araneomorphae genera
Spiders of Asia
Taxa named by Eugène Simon